Guatemala competed at the 2019 World Aquatics Championships in Gwangju, South Korea from 12 to 28 July.

Open water swimming

Guatemala qualified one male and one female open water swimmers.

Men

Women

Swimming

Guatemala entered four swimmers.

Men

Women

References

World Aquatics Championships
2019
Nations at the 2019 World Aquatics Championships